Pierrefonds may refer to:

 Pierrefonds, Oise commune in Oise, France
 Château de Pierrefonds, castle in Pierrefonds, restored by Eugène Viollet-le-Duc
 Pierrefonds-Roxboro, a borough of Montreal, Canada
Pierrefonds Comprehensive High School, a high-school in the borough
Pierrefonds-Senneville, the borough that preceded the current one
Pierrefonds, Quebec, a defunct city now part of the borough
Pierrefonds—Dollard, a federal district on the island of Montreal 
Pierrefonds Airport, an airport in the island of Réunion
Pierrefonds River, a tributary of the Panache River in Quebec, Canada